Ángel Agustín María Carlos Fausto Mariano Alfonso del Sagrado Corazón de Jesús Lara y Aguirre del Pino (October 30, 1897 – November 6, 1970), known as Agustín Lara, was a Mexican composer and performer of songs and boleros. He is recognized as one of the most popular songwriters of his era. His work was widely appreciated not only in Mexico but also in Central and South America, the Caribbean and Spain. After his death, he has also been recognized in the United States, Italy and Japan.

Notable performers of his work include Pedro Vargas who was a friend, Juan Arvizu, Nestor Mesta Chayres, Pedro Infante, Javier Solís, Julio Iglesias, Manuel Mijares, Vicente Fernandez, Luis Miguel, Perez Prado, Chavela Vargas and Natalia Lafourcade among others.

Outside the Spanish speaking world, his most famous songs are Granada, Solamente Una Vez (You Belong to My Heart) and Piensa en mí, which have both been recorded by numerous international singers, including Enrico Caruso, Mario Lanza and José Carreras.

Biography

Lara was born in Tlacotalpan, Veracruz to Joaquín Lara and Mara Aguirre del Pino. Later, the Lara family had to move to Mexico City, establishing their house in the borough of Coyoacán. After their mother died, Agustín and his siblings lived in a hospice run by their aunt. It was there that he had his first contact with music.

Lara's first musical composition was Marucha, written in honor of one of his first loves. In 1927 he already was working in cabarets. It was around this time that he was involved in an argument with a showgirl named Estrella, who slashed him in the face with a broken bottle, leaving a distinct scar (a Glasgow smile) on his cheek. He subsequently moved to Puebla, but returned to Mexico City in 1928. That same year he started working for the tenor Juan Arvizu as composer and accompanist. In September 1930, Lara began a successful radio career. At the same time he acted and composed songs for such films as Santa.

Lara's first tour, to Cuba in 1933, was a failure because of political turmoil on the island. Later, more successful tours in South America, as well as such new compositions as Solamente Una Vez (composed in Buenos Aires and dedicated to José Mojica), Veracruz, Tropicana, and Pecadora increased his fame.

In 1934 he went to Los Angeles, where he did multiple concerts at the California Theatre. He would later return to the city to write songs for Tropic Holiday (1938), a musical film.

By the beginning of the 1940s, Lara was well known in Spain. In 1965, the Spanish dictator Francisco Franco, gave him a house in Granada to show his appreciation of Lara's songs with Spanish themes, such as Toledo, Cuerdas de mi Guitarra, Granada, Seville and Madrid. He received additional honors and decorations from around the world.

His career was portrayed in the 1959 Mexican film The Life of Agustín Lara.

In 1968, Lara's health began to decline rapidly; and a fall that occurred on October 16, 1970 fractured his pelvis. He was hospitalized under the false name of Carlos Flores, but the press learned about his hospitalization anyway. The next day, October 17, 1970, he experienced cardiorespiratory arrest in the elevator while being transferred to the intensive care unit. He never regained consciousness, and on November 6, 1970, Lara died. He was buried in Mexico City. By the time of his death, Lara had written more than 700 songs.

A biography of him, "Agustín Lara: Vida y Pasiones", was written by his friend Javier Ruiz Rueda.

Family 

Agustín was a son of Joaquín Lara and his wife María Aguirre y Pino. He had an aunt named Refugio Aguirre del Pino and younger sister, María Teresa Lara. He married María Félix and Rocío Durán (whom he adopted) and was a stepfather to the actor Enrique Álvarez Félix, who died in 1996.

Sons of Lara are Gerardo Agustín Lara Santacruz (with sixth wife Yolanda Santacruz Gasca) and Agustín Lara Lárraga (biological son of actress Vianey Lárraga, one of Lara's wives).

Selected filmography
Melodies of America (1941)
Mujer en condominio (1958) including the song "Arroyito", composed and sung by Lara in the film

References

External links 

 SACM 
 Biblioteca Babab 
 
 
 Sound recordings of boleros written by Agustín Lara on Archive.org
 Agustín Lara recordings at the Discography of American Historical Recordings.

Mexican composers of popular or traditional folk music
Mexican male singer-songwriters
Latin music songwriters
Mexican male film actors
María Félix
Agustin
Male actors from Mexico City
Male actors from Veracruz
Musicians from Mexico City
Singers from Mexico City
Singers from Veracruz
20th-century Mexican male actors
1897 births
1970 deaths
20th-century Mexican male singers
People from Tlacotalpan